Cappella Sistina may refer to:
 Sistine Chapel
 Sistine Chapel Choir